Wang Weibo (born 30 October 1998) is a Chinese footballer currently playing as a defender for Beijing BSU.

Career statistics

Club
.

References

1998 births
Living people
Chinese footballers
Association football defenders
China League One players
Beijing Guoan F.C. players
Guangdong South China Tiger F.C. players
Guizhou F.C. players
Beijing Sport University F.C. players